Ab Ke Baras ( This Year) is a 2002 Indian Hindi language action romance film. It had launched the career of the two newcomers, Amrita Rao and Arya Babbar.

Plot 
U.S. based Anjali Thapar has repeated dreams of a parallel life in India, the temple of Devi Maa Durga, some sword-wielding men on horseback. She and her mom consult a pandit, and he advises them to go to India to clear this matter up, as this pertains to her past life. Mr. Thapar will only let Anjali go there after she marries the man of his choice, so Anjali decides to run away. Her dad alerts her uncle, a ruthless CBI Officer, DCP Sikander Baksh, who is soon on her case. Anjali meets with car-thieves, Karan and his uncle, and then begins her journey into a past life, as Nandini, the lover of freedom fighter Abhay, and his subsequent death at the hands of British-aided traitor Tejeshwar Singhal. But both Karan and Anjali are unaware of the consequences. They both reach a college camp as husband and wife where college girls and professors give them new clothes and treat them lovingly. They both run away from the camp in the morning and come across a gang leader Ashish Vidyarthi whom Anjali remembers as the leader of goons attacking her in the old hotel. He along with his cronies takes the duo hostage and threatens them to reveal the location of his car as it has illegal arms worth 50 million. Anjali takes the robbers far into the forest and orders Karan to run from there. But Karan refuses and starts running dragging Anjali along. Then the goons attack them both, Karan is gravely injured and left to die near the river bank. He unfortunately falls into the river due to taking a bullet in his shoulder. Anjali is taken to a large villa and Vidyarthi leaves her alone inside a large room after slapping her angrily. Anjali shouts saying Karan is alive and will come back. Vidyarthi leaves for fetching his nephew Rajvir. It is revealed that Karan is found by an old doctor who knows Tejeshwar of old and describes his brutality as a British police officer who killed innocent protestors. Anjali meanwhile comes across Singhal's portrait and starts thinking of an escape route. She happily declares Tejeshwar will be soon finished. She stands in a corner for some time, lost in her own thoughts. Here, Tejeshwar is delivering a speech while canvassing for the upcoming elections with his sons and an assistant. Soon, the canvassing ends and Rajvir reaches the villa with his goons who lead him to the hostage, Anjali. Anjali threatens him to let go of her. She denies knowing anything when Rajvir asks her about their goods. Impressed with the beautiful and fiery teenage girl, Rajvir chides his uncle and their goons, apologizing to Anjali for their rude behavior. He asks them all to leave. Forwarding his hand he introduces himself and Anjali reciprocates. Rajvir kisses her knuckles and Anjali asks him about the man in the portrait. Rajvir tells her about his father and she expresses her desire to meet him. Rajvir agrees and they attend the evening birthday celebration in Tejeshwar's honor. Anjali is delighted to see Karan alive over there after being fetched by her uncle, and they start planning Tejeshwar's downfall. Rajvir falls in love with Anjali and Bmw i.e., Shakti Kapoor comes there as anjali's father. He brags about his wealth and Tejeshwar happily agrees for the alliance. The very same night, Anjali cleverly extracts the hidden safe information from Rajvir about their black money. But Rajvir tries to kill her after catching her red handed. While he attacks her with broken wine bottles, Karan saves her by killing Rajvir in the nick of time. Then rajvir's uncle is accused of killing him and abandoned by the family members mourning their son. Later, Tejeshwar's illegal consignments are destroyed. When he abducts Anjali and Bmw while trying to flee india, Karan and the police attack his helicopter in a second defence chopper. Rescuing Anjali, the police gun down Tejeshwar and his older son. Sikandar Baksh proudly produces a freedom order for Karan. As Karan and Anjali stare at him surprised, he bounds their hands with the same chain handcuff, this uniting the duo for ever.

Cast 
 Arya Babbar as Karan/Abhay
 Amrita Rao as Anjali Thapar/Nandini 
 Ashutosh Rana as Tejeshwar Singhal 
 Danny Denzongpa as CBI Officer Sikander Baksh 
 Shakti Kapoor as Cameo appearance   
 Ghanshyam as Kancha 
 Ashish Vidyarthi as Rudra Singh
Shakti Kapoor as Bmw
Vishwajeet Pradhan as Bali
Vivek Shauq as Nainsukh Pathak
Nina Kulkarni as Prerna
Mohan Joshi as Raghuvir Singh
Dolly Minhas as Abhay Sister
Rajat Bedi as Rajbir Singhal
 Manoj Joshi
Snehal Dabi
Hemant Pandey as Hotel/ Lodge Manager
 Yusuf Hussain

Track listing
Music composer is Anu Malik. The song "Aya Mahi Aya" was quite popular.

Critical reception
Priyanka Bhattacharya of Rediff.com wrote ″Director Raj Kanwar uses the tried-and-tested reincarnation formula. But he seems to lose focus somewhere along the film. So in spite of a decent beginning, the film gets hopelessly melodramatic and irksome post interval.″

References

External links

2000s Hindi-language films
2002 films
Films about reincarnation
Films scored by Anu Malik
Indian romantic action films
Films directed by Raj Kanwar
2000s romantic action films
Hindi-language romance films